Remy Macaspac Martin (born June 16, 1998) is a Filipino-American professional basketball player for Lavrio of the Greek Basket League. He played college basketball at Arizona State University and the University of Kansas, where he was a part of the Jayhawks 2022 National Championship Team.

College career

Arizona State (2017–2021)
After attending Sierra Canyon School, Martin committed to Arizona State. As a freshman, Martin averaged 9.6 points, 3.0 rebounds, and 2.9 assists per game and earned Sixth-Man of the Year honors in the Pac-12. He scored 21 points in an upset of Kansas. As a sophomore, Martin struggled with injuries which forced him to miss a few games but still averaged 12.9 points, 5.0 assists and 3.2 rebounds per game. He was named second-team All-Pac-12.

Martin had a career-high 31 points to go with eight assists in a 95–88 overtime win over Arizona on January 31, 2019. At the conclusion of the regular season, Martin was named first-team All-Pac-12. He averaged 19.1 points (second in conference), 4.1 assists and 3.1 rebounds per game as a junior, and he led the Pac-12 with a 2.4 assist-to-turnover ratio. Following the season, Martin declared for the 2020 NBA draft. On August 2, he announced he was withdrawing from the draft and returning for his senior season. On April 6, 2021, he declared for the 2021 NBA draft. He maintained his college eligibility and entered the transfer portal.

Kansas (2021–2022)
Martin announced his commitment to Kansas on May 17, 2021. He was ranked as one of the top-3 transfer players heading into the season. In their 2021-22 season opener, he scored 15 points on 5-of-9 shooting against Michigan State. On December 29, 2021, he suffered a right knee injury. That injury kept him ineffective throughout January and caused him to miss seven games in February. He was able to return for the final game of the month, which was a loss to Baylor. He then had 12 points and a season-high three steals in the Big-12 tournament championship game victory over Texas Tech. In the opening round, he had 15 points, four assists, and two steals against Texas Southern. He then went on to have 20 points and 7 rebounds against Creighton the next round, and 23 points in the Sweet 16 against Providence. After Kansas beat Miami to move on to the Final Four, he was named Most Outstanding Player of the Midwest regional. In the national championship game he only scored three points in the first half, but had 11 crucial points after the half, helping Kansas beat North Carolina for its fourth national championship. He is the third Filipino-American basketball player to win a national championship, after Raymond Townsend with UCLA in 1975, and Kihei Clark with Virginia in 2019.

Professional career
After going undrafted in the 2022 NBA Draft, Martin was drafted 40th overall by the Cleveland Charge in the NBA G League. He was drafted with a second round pick from a previous trade. On October 24, 2022, Martin joined the training camp roster. However, he did not make the final roster.

On November 11, 2022, Martin signed his first professional contract overseas with Lavrio of the Greek Basket League.

Career statistics

College

|-
| style="text-align:left;"| 2017–18
| style="text-align:left;"| Arizona State
| 32 || 1 || 23.8 || .453 || .371 || .755 || 3.0 || 2.9 || 1.1 || .1 || 9.6
|-
| style="text-align:left;"| 2018–19
| style="text-align:left;"| Arizona State
| 32 || 28 || 32.6 || .402 || .312 || .736 || 3.2 || 5.0 || 1.3 || .0 || 12.9
|-
| style="text-align:left;"| 2019–20
| style="text-align:left;"| Arizona State
| 31 || 31 || 33.8 || .432 || .335 || .772 || 3.1 || 4.1 || 1.5 || .0 || 19.1
|-
| style="text-align:left;"| 2020–21
| style="text-align:left;"| Arizona State
| 23 || 23 || 33.5 || .433 || .346 || .776 || 2.8 || 3.7 || 1.2 || .0 || 19.1
|-
| style="text-align:left;"| 2021–22
| style="text-align:left;"| Kansas
| 29 || 13 || 21.2 || .458 || .357 || .754 || 3.0 || 2.6 || .6 || .1 || 8.4
|- class="sortbottom"
| style="text-align:center;" colspan="2"| Career
| 147 || 95 || 28.8 || .432 || .338 || .761 || 3.0 || 3.7 || 1.1 || .1 || 13.6

Personal life
Martin's father is African-American and his mother is Filipino. He holds dual citizenship with the United States and the Philippines.

References

External links
Kansas Jayhawks bio
Arizona State Sun Devils bio

1998 births
Living people
American men's basketball players
American people of Kapampangan descent
American expatriate basketball people in Greece
Arizona State Sun Devils men's basketball players
Basketball players from California
Citizens of the Philippines through descent
Filipino men's basketball players
Kansas Jayhawks men's basketball players
Lavrio B.C. players
People from Chatsworth, Los Angeles
Point guards
Sierra Canyon School alumni